Metsä Tissue is a Finnish company headquartered in Espoo that manufactures tissue papers and greaseproof papers. Metsä Tissue sells its products under brands Lambi, Serla, Mola, Tento, Katrin and SAGA. In Sweden, they have paper mills in Mariestad, Kvillsfors, and Pauliström. In Finland, Metsä Tissue has one mill located in Mänttä. In Germany Metsä Tissue has three mills located in Raubach, Kreuzau and Düren. Metsä Tissue also has mills in Krapkowice, Poland and Zilina, Slovakia. It has a total of nine paper mills, all in Europe. Metsä Tissue is part of Metsä Group, one of the largest forest industry groups in the world. The company's operations in Russia ended in 2015.

References

External links 

GA Serlachius Museum

Pulp and paper companies of Finland
Companies established in 1868
1868 establishments in Finland
Companies based in Helsinki